The Fallen Man is the twelfth crime fiction novel in the Joe Leaphorn / Jim Chee Navajo Tribal Police series by Tony Hillerman, first published in 1996.

A group of mountain climbers discover a corpse on Shiprock. Retired Joe Leaphorn and Acting Lieutenant Jim Chee work together, as Leaphorn recalls an old missing person case. Captain Largo is concerned with the theft of cattle, which case introduces Officer Bernadette Manuelito.

Plot summary

In late fall, three climbers who scaled Shiprock find a corpse, a skeleton in climber's gear, on a nearly inaccessible shelf just below the peak. Acting Lieutenant Jim Chee is trying his hand at administration of the special investigations unit. Captain Largo is pressing them to work on cattle thieving. Joe Leaphorn, retired five months earlier, cautiously approaches Chee with his memory of a missing person case from eleven years before, never solved. Hal Breedlove is a likely candidate, as he was mountain climber always seeking challenges, and Shiprock is a most challenging climb. It is Hal, which news Chee brings to Hal's widow Elisa on their ranch near Mancos, Colorado. The couple and her brother Eldon Demott had been celebrating their fifth wedding anniversary and Hal's birthday on a trip to the reservation, including Canyon de Chelly. She inherited the ranch once he was declared dead; Hal got full ownership of it on his thirtieth birthday, just before he disappeared.

Chee is engaged to marry Janet Pete, but they have a dispute arising from John McDermott, her former boss and lover. Chee turns his focus to mastering the administrative duties of his job. Rookie officer Bernadette Manuelito is taking initiative on the cattle rustling problems; she asks Lucy Sam to watch and record events near her hogan. Lucy uses the format her late father used in his ledgers, which were started before 1985. Manuelito figures out that Dick Finch, the cattle brand inspector and a law man himself, is the most likely suspect.

John McDermott calls Joe Leaphorn to work as a private investigator. McDermott comes out from Washington DC with George Shaw, cousin to Hal and part of the Edgar Breedlove family. Shaw pays for Leaphorn's time, because the family wants to regain possession of the ranch. Leaphorn gathers information and keeps in touch with Chee. Chee returns to Lucy Sam and on second look, he finds that Hosteen Sam observed three climbers on Shiprock, September 18, 1985, two days before Hal's crucial birthday. Chee proceeds directly to Hosteen Austin Maryboy, who collects fees from climbers wanting to begin their climb from his property. Maryboy is shot dead, just a few minutes before Chee arrives. Despite great care in his exit, Chee is shot twice through the car door just after he radios his location. Colleague Teddy Begayaye rescues Chee. Neither sees the attacker in the dark night. From his hospital bed, Chee tells Leaphorn that he went to see Maryboy to learn if he remembers the three climbers from that day in 1985. Leaphorn praises Chee for the new facts, which open up the investigation. Leaphorn thinks the Demotts are the most likely candidates for the past death, if it was murder, and for the present shootings of Nez and Maryboy. Both saw the group in 1985. Nez met them at Canyon de Chelly after September 20. Nez survives, so it is important to protect him. Leaphorn uses a helicopter and his friend Rosebrough to take pictures of the climbers’ log atop Shiprock, revealing a third date, September 30, when only Hal Breedlove signed the book, with the Latin aphorism, vita brevis. Chee shows the photograph of the signature to Elisa, who falls apart in tears. Chee goes home to meet Janet Pete, who says she is taking leave to go home and reconsider her life.

Leaphorn shows photographs to Amos Nez at his hogan. Nez does not recognize Hal Breedlove. The man he knew as Breedlove is Eldon Demott. Leaphorn drives to a point above Nez's hogan, where he expects Eldon will come to kill Nez. Eldon arrives and hears from Leaphorn how strong the evidence is to convict him for killing Maryboy and for shooting Chee. Those two would put him in prison for life, and rightly so. Eldon wants to keep his sister out of the trouble Hal and then Eldon have made, and to save the ranch from mining. The shooting of Nez, now of no FBI interest, would become interesting if Nez testifies in court. Eldon reveals that all three went climbing, but Elisa stopped short of the peak. Leaphorn tells Eldon how the situation plays out depends on him. Eldon writes a note to his sister that he did not kill Hal, it was an accident, but leaves the confusion of dates standing. Abruptly, he runs off the edge of the cliff into the Canyon del Muerto. Leaphorn heads home, leaving no evidence of his own presence, and tells Chee, off-duty, what went on. Chee in turn tells him how Officer Manuelito arrested Dick Finch today, caught in the act of stealing cattle in his vehicle.

Characters
Joe Leaphorn: Lieutenant in the Navajo Tribal Police, retired about five months earlier, and widowed a few years.
Jim Chee: Acting Lieutenant in the Navajo Tribal Police, based in Shiprock.
Emma Leaphorn: Late wife of Joe, whose cause of death we learn was not the benign brain tumor successfully removed, but a staph infection contracted in the hospital afterward.
Janet Pete: Attorney for DNA, the public defenders for the Navajo Nation, and fiancée of Jim Chee. Introduced in A Thief of Time.
Harold (Hal) Breedlove: Heir of family ranch when he turned 30 in 1985 who became a missing person from Canyon de Chelly on the Navajo Nation.
Elisa Breedlove: Widow of Harold and a kind woman, running a cattle ranch with her brother in Colorado. She had been married to Hal for five years when he disappeared.
Eldon Demott: Older brother of Elisa Breedlove by 12 or 13 years, who works the ranch with her. He is a mountain climber, and called a "tree hugger" by the local banker.
Tommy Castro: Friend of Eldon Demott from high school who climbed with him years earlier. He pursued Elisa before she married Hal, and Eldon discouraged him, saying he is too old for his young sister.
Bill Buchanan: One of three climbers on Shiprock at the end of October.
John Whiteside: Climber on Shiprock, risk taker, traverses at the cliff edge, and sees a shelf with a climber's helmet and a skull in it.
Jim Stapp: One of the three climbers on Shiprock who find the skeleton.
John McDermott: Attorney for the Edgar Breedlove family, and formerly connected with Janet Pete as professor, employer and lover. First mentioned in Talking God.
George Shaw: Cousin and friend to Breedlove, mountain climber, and lawyer. He was executor for the will when Hal was declared dead. Now the family wants to investigate.
Dick Finch: Cattle brand inspector for New Mexico.
Hosteen Austin Maryboy: Navajo who owns the property at the approach to the climb of Shiprock and asks for payment from climbers to be on his land. He is murdered after the skeleton is found and identified.
Hosteen Amos Nez: Guide for the Breedloves eleven years earlier, when they toured Canyon de Chelly. He is shot by a sharpshooter immediately after the skeleton is found and identified, but he lives.
Captain Largo: Chee's superior officer at the Shiprock office of the Navajo Tribal Police.
Bernadette Manuelito: Rookie officer in the special investigations unit, 26 years old, eager to learn how to be a detective. She was already assigned to the unit before Chee took over.
Teddy Begayaye: Officer in Navajo Tribal Police special investigations unit who rescues Chee when he is shot.
Hosteen Sam: Old Navajo man who watched the mountain of Shiprock, keeping a daily ledger of natural and human activities he could see from his hogan with the aid of a powerful telescope, beginning more than eleven years earlier. He died a year before the story begins.
Lucy Sam: His daughter, who saves her father's ledgers and resumes observations at the request of Officer Manuelito to aid in finding the cattle rustlers.
Elliott Lewis: FBI agent, three weeks out of FBI training school, who pursues the murder of Austin Maryboy.
Bob Rosebrough: Lawyer friend of Leaphorn, and a mountain climber, who agrees to go up in the helicopter to the top of Shiprock to photograph the pages in the climbers log. He is named for a real person.

Geography
In his 2011 book Tony Hillerman's Navajoland: Hideouts, Haunts, and Havens in the Joe Leaphorn and Jim Chee Mysteries, author  has listed the following 57 geographical locations mentioned in The Fallen Man. 

Albuquerque, New Mexico
Aztec, New Mexico
Beautiful Mountain, New Mexico
Beclabito, New Mexico
Bloomfield, New Mexico
Bridge Timber Mountain, Colorado
Burnham, New Mexico
Canyon de Chelly National Monument,Arizona
Canyon Del Muerto, Arizona
Carrizo Mountains, Arizona
Casa Del Eco Mesa, Utah
Checkerboard Reservation, New Mexico
Chinle, Arizona
Chuska Mountains in New Mexico and Arizona
Cortez, Colorado
El Diente Peak, Colorado
Farmington, New Mexico
Flagstaff, Arizona
Gallup, New Mexico
Ganado, Arizona
Grand Canyon
Hesperus Peak, Colorado
Hogback, New Mexico
Jicarilla Apache Reservation, New Mexico
Keams Canyon, Arizona
La Plata Mountains in Colorado
Little Shiprock Wash, New Mexico
Lizard Head Peak, Colorado
Lukachukai, Arizona
Mancos, Colorado
Mesa Verde region in Colorado and New Mexico
Morgan Lake, New Mexico
Mount Taylor (New Mexico)
Navajo National Monument in Arizona
Popping Rock, New Mexico
Rattlesnake, New Mexico
Red Rock, Apache County, Arizona
Red Rock Trading Post, Arizona
Red Wash, New Mexico and Arizona
Rol Hai Rock, New Mexico
St. Michaels, Arizona
Salt Creek Wash, New Mexico
San Juan Mountains in Colorado
San Juan River (Colorado River tributary) in Colorado, New Mexico and Utah
Shiprock, New Mexico
Sleeping Ute Mountain, Colorado
Sweetwater, Pima County, Arizona
Sweetwater Trading Post, Arizona
Table Mesa, New Mexico
Teec Nos Pos, Arizona
Tuba City, Arizona
Two Grey Hills, New Mexico
Upper Wheatfields, Arizona
Wasatch Mountains, Utah
Whitehorse (Lake), New Mexico
White House Ruin, Arizona
Window Rock, Arizona

Reviews

Kirkus Reviews finds this novel's plot less complex than Sacred Clowns, but irresistible:

Legendary Lt. Joe Leaphorn has finally retired from the Navajo Tribal Police, but that doesn't keep him away when a skeleton is found on a remote ledge of the spectacular 1700-foot-high Shiprock, a mountain sacred to the Navajo. Leaphorn tells Acting Lt. Jim Chee that the skeleton could be the remains of Harold Breedlove, the ranching heir who went missing during a trip he and his wife Elisa were taking in the area 11 years ago, days after the 30th birthday that brought him into the proceeds of his family trust fund. It's not easy for Chee to focus on the case, since his boss, under pressure from New Mexico brand inspector Dick Pfaff to catch the cattle rustler Pfaff calls Zorro, is more interested in Chee's checking the Breedlove spread--now run by Elisa's tree-hugging brother Eldon DeWitt--for stolen livestock. But the shooting of elderly Amos Nez, the Breedloves' guide on their fatal trip, convinces Leaphorn and Chee that the old case has suddenly roared to life--a hunch that's confirmed when Leaphorn is hired by Breedlove family attorney John McDermott (who just happens to be the treacherous former mentor and lover of Chee's fiancée Janet Pete) to investigate Breedlove's death, and the owner of the land around Shiprock is gunned down before Chee can talk to him. It'll take the combined ingenuity of irascible Leaphorn and contemplative Chee to spot the clue Leaphorn missed a decade ago--and their combined wisdom to figure out what to do with their knowledge. The autumnal 12th entry in this distinguished series is less complex and energetic than Sacred Clowns (1993), but Hillerman's legion of fans, impatient for a return to the reservation ever since the author's Vietnam novel, Finding Moon (1995), will likely find it irresistible.

Library Journal says that the writing is strong but the plot not very mysterious:

Having explored the Vietnam War in Finding Moon (LJ 11/1/95), Hillerman returns to the desert Southwest in his newest work. On Halloween a human skeleton is discovered near the peak of the 1700-foot-high Ship Rock, a favorite of climbers and a holy site to the Navajos. Could it be the body of Hal Breedlove, a rancher who went missing 11 years ago? Retired tribal police officer Joe Leaphorn, who had investigated the case, approaches newly promoted Lieutenant Jim Chee with his theory. But before they can close the case, an old Navajo guide who was the last man to see Breedlove alive is seriously wounded by a sniper, raising the possibility that Breedlove's death was murder. While fans may rejoice at the return of Leaphorn and Chee, they may also be disappointed. The trouble with series like Hillerman's is that with each succeeding book the fresh and unique qualities that made them so popular become ever more stale and tired. While Hillerman still evokes the exotic beauty of Navajo land and its traditions, his mystery is not very mysterious nor interesting. Stick with his earlier better books like The People of Darkness (1978) or try the Santa Fe mysteries of Jake Page (The Stolen Gods, LJ 2/1/93; The Lethal Partner, LJ 11/15/95).

School Library Journal also finds the vivid descriptions typical of Hillerman, but says this plot lacks the suspense of earlier stories in the series:

YA [Young Adult]. The latest Jim Chee and Joe Leaphorn mystery has vivid descriptions of Native American mythology and traditions but lacks the suspense and tightly woven plot of the earlier titles in this popular series. A skeleton is found on a high ledge of Ship Rock mountain, a place sacred to the Navahos. Tribal Police Lieutenant Chee and the now retired Leaphorn suspect correctly that it belongs to a wealthy rancher missing for 11 years, and Chee tries to discover if it is murder or an accidental death. Meanwhile, Leaphorn is hired by a lawyer to look into the investigation for the rancher's Eastern family, who want to own his land legally so they can accept a lucrative bid for the mining rights. The obvious suspects, if there was foul play, are the young woman who inherited the ranch and her brother who manages it. In addition to uncovering the cause of death, Chee must determine if the rancher died before or after his 30th birthday when he legally inherited the ranch from a family trust. The continuing rocky romance between Chee and tribal lawyer Janet Pete brings an interesting love angle to the story. Environmentalism and the survival of Native American culture are strong themes.

Gary Dretzka writing in the Chicago Tribune finds Hillerman back in top form. He says that "After a bit of a lull in the series, The Fallen Man finds Hillerman back in top form. The reappearance of Leaphorn seems less a contrivance than a godsend, as Chee is challenged to demonstrate his mettle under fire, and several interesting auxiliary characters are given room to blossom."

Publication history

This novel was published in English and in sixteen other languages.

References

Bibliography

External links
The Fallen Man at Tony Hillerman Portal

1996 novels
Novels by Tony Hillerman
HarperCollins books
Novels set in Arizona
Novels set in New Mexico